Marc'Aurelio was an Italian satirical magazine, published between 1931 and 1958, and briefly resurrected in 1973.

History and profile
The weekly magazine was founded in Rome by Oberdan Catone and Vito De Bellis in 1931. It was the first satirical magazine to be started in Italy following the forced closure of other satirical magazines by the Fascist regime, particularly Il Becco Giallo, of which it inheredit many collaborators. It immediately distinguished itself for its original humour, often abstract and surreal. Initially polemic and courageous, after several judicial seizures it gradually ignored political themes and focusing in a humour which was  an end in itself, eventually getting a large success and selling over 300,000 copies a week.

In 1952 it was launched a Ligurian edition of the magazine, directed by Enzo La Rosa. In 1954 the magazine became fortnightly, and shortly later monthly.

In 1955 Marc'Aurelio was acquired by the publisher Corrado Tedeschi who moved the editorial staff in Florence, and the magazine reprised its weekly basis. It eventually ceased its publications in 1958.

Many young collaborators of the magazine including Federico Fellini, Steno, Vittorio Metz, Ettore Scola, Cesare Zavattini, Age & Scarpelli, Ruggero Maccari, after the World War II started successful careers in the Italian film industry.

In 1973 Delfina Metz (the daughter of Vittorio), with the artistic supervision of Enrico De Seta, shortly relaunched the magazine, which definitively closed the same year after 26 issues.

See also
 List of magazines in Italy

References

Further reading
Adolfo Chiesa (ed.). Antologia del “Marc'Aurelio”. 1931-1954. Napoleone, 1974.

1931 establishments in Italy
1958 disestablishments in Italy
Defunct magazines published in Italy
Humor magazines
Italian-language magazines
Magazines established in 1931
Magazines disestablished in 1958
Magazines published in Rome
Magazines published in Florence
Monthly magazines published in Italy
Satirical magazines published in Italy
Weekly magazines published in Italy